Poundon is a hamlet and a civil parish in Aylesbury Vale district in Buckinghamshire, England.  It is located near the Oxfordshire border, about four miles northeast of Bicester, three miles southwest of Steeple Claydon.

The hamlet name is Anglo Saxon in origin, though its meaning is uncertain.  In manorial rolls of 1255 it was recorded as Paundon.

Poundon Hill wireless station
Poundon Hill wireless station was a FCO/MI6 signals intelligence station just outside the hamlet. The site is now Tower Hill Business Park. During the Second World War Poundon and Poundon House were sites of stations 53b and 53c of the Special Operations Executive (SOE).

See also
 List of SOE establishments

References 

Hamlets in Buckinghamshire
Civil parishes in Buckinghamshire